was a mid-Heian period Japanese poet. She was the contemporary of Murasaki Shikibu,  and Akazome Emon at the court of empress Joto Mon'in.

She "is considered by many to have been the greatest woman poet of the Heian period".  Her legacy includes 242 poems and two kashu.

"Torn between worldly ties and physical desire, Izumi Shikibu left a wealth of passionate love poetry, fueling rumors that purported that she was a femme fatale with numerous lovers besides her two husbands and two princely lovers."

Early life
Izumi Shikibu was the daughter of Oe no Masamune, governor of Echizen. Her mother was the daughter of Taira no Yasuhira, governor of Etchu. In 995, at the age of 20, Izumi was married to Tachibana no Michisada, governor of Izumi, the origin for her name.  Their daughter was born in 997, Koshikibu no Naishi, who also became a poet.  However, Izumi soon divorced, and her former husband died soon afterwards.

Affairs and marriages
She had a sequence of affairs at the imperial court in Kyoto. In the beginning, before her marriage to Michisada, she is believed to have been the companion (some accounts say wife) of a man named Omotomaru at dowager Queen Shoko's court.

While still married to Michisada, she fell in love and had an affair with Emperor Reizei's third son, Prince Tametaka (Danjo no Miya Tametaka Shinnō:弾正宮為尊親王 977-1002). As a result of the scandal her husband divorced her and her family disowned her. The Eiga Monogatari implies that Tametaka fell ill and died because of his "continual nocturnal escapades."

The first year of this affair is described in her semi-autobiographical Diary. Her motive in writing the diary "seems to have been written solely to appease her mind, and to record the poems which passed between them." Izumi then moved into Atsumichi's residence, and the two had a very public courtship until Atsumichi's death in 1007 at the age of 27.

Soon after, probably in 1009, Izumi joined the court of Fujiwara no Shōshi, who was the daughter of Fujiwara no Michinaga, and the consort of Emperor Ichijō.

Further testimony of the scandal caused by her successive affairs with the Princes Tametaka and Atsumichi can be found in two historical tales (rekishi monogatari) about the period, A Tale of Flowering Fortunes (or Eiga Monogatari), c. mid-eleventh century, and The Great Mirror (or Ōkagami), c. late eleventh century.

Diary

Izumi Shikibu Nikki was written at the beginning of Izumi's relationship with Prince Atsumichi and continues for about nine months (1003-1004).  Written in a third person narrative, the diary contains waka poetry, with over one hundred poems including renga. The "plot" is one of "alternate ardor and indifference on the part of the Prince, and timidity and yearning on the part of Izumi."

Also at the court at the same time as Izumi were Akazome Emon, Murasaki Shikibu, and Ise no Tayu.

Later years
While at the court in 1009, she married Fujiwara no Yasumasa (958-1036), a military commander under Michinaga famous for his bravery, and left the court to accompany him to his charge in Tango Province. She outlived her daughter Koshikibu no Naishi, but the year of her death is unknown. The last Imperial correspondence from her was a poem written in 1027.  The Eiga Monogatari includes this poem, which accompanied Yasumasa's offering of jewels for a Buddha figure "made in memory of the Empress Dowager Yoshiko."

She later devoted herself to Buddhism, donning Buddhist robes that she wore for the rest of her life. Her Dharma name was Seishin Insei Hōni (誠心院専意法尼).

Legacy 

In contemporary arts, the Opéra National de Paris and the Grand Théâtre de Genève jointly commissioned an opera based on her poems. Titled Da gelo a gelo by Salvatore Sciarrino and sung in Italian, the work draws on 65 poems from Izumi Shikibu Nikki that features her passion for Prince Atsumichi. It was performed in early 2008 in Geneva with the Chamber Orchestra of Geneva.

Poetry

References

Bibliography

Further reading 
 Izumi Shikibu. (2019). The Izumi Shikibu nikki. TOYO Press.

External links 

 

  The Diary of Izumi Shikibu,  by Izumi Shikibu (974- ) Publication: Diaries of Court Ladies of Old Japan. translated by Annie Shepley Omori and Kochi Doi, with an introduction by Amy Lowell. Boston and New York: Houghton Mifflin Company, 1920, pp. 147–196.

970s births
Japanese women poets
Women of medieval Japan
10th-century Japanese women writers
10th-century Japanese poets
11th-century Japanese women writers
Ladies-in-waiting of Heian-period Japan
Heian period Buddhists
Buddhism and women
1030 deaths
Year of death unknown
11th-century Japanese poets
Hyakunin Isshu poets
10th-century Japanese people
11th-century Japanese people
Japanese diarists